The Pacific Star Building, also known as the Nauru Building, is a 29-storey high-rise building in Makati, Metro Manila, Philippines. It was the tallest building in the country upon its completion.

Background
The building was built by the Republic of Nauru through its Nauru Phosphate Royalties Trust. The high-rise building is managed by Century Properties Group. An adjacent 6-storey low-rise office building, the Pacific Star Building Low Rise is also partially owned by the company and is part of the building complex. The Monterrey building of DMCI was demolished to give way to the construction of the building. Completed in 1989 and inaugurated on May 17, 1989, by then Nauruan Health and Education Minister Reuben J. Kun, Pacific Star Building was the tallest building in the Philippines upon its completion until it was surpassed by Rufino Pacific Tower.

Architecture and design
The Pacific Star Building consists of two buildings, a 29-storey high-rise building with four basement levels and a 6-storey low-rise building which is built around a semicircular driveway ornamented with a fountain.

The building was designed by architect, Gabriel Formoso under his firm, GF & Partners Architects. The architecture firm describes the building's arches as inspired from Spanish architecture. Siemens Building Technologies was responsible for the structural engineering of the building.

Reception
The building is among the few buildings at the Makati Central Business District to be rated five stars by the Makati Commercial Estates Association.

See also
 List of tallest buildings in Metro Manila
 Nauru House

References

Office buildings in Metro Manila
Buildings and structures in Makati
Office buildings completed in 1989
History of Nauru
Nauru–Philippines relations
20th-century architecture in the Philippines